Ashim Kumar Ukil is a Bangladesh Awami League politician and the incumbent Member of Parliament of Netrokona-3.

Career
Ashim Kumar Ukil was elected to parliament from Netrokona-3 as a Bangladesh Awami League candidate 30 December 2018. He is the Cultural Secretary of Bangladesh Awami League.

References

Living people
Year of birth missing (living people)
People from Netrokona District
Awami League politicians
11th Jatiya Sangsad members